Euamiana adusta is a species of moth in the family Noctuidae (the owlet moths). It is found in North America.

The MONA or Hodges number for Euamiana adusta is 9807.1.

References

Further reading

 
 
 

Amphipyrinae
Articles created by Qbugbot
Moths described in 1986